The United States national roller hockey team is the national team side of United States at international roller hockey. Usually is part of FIRS Roller Hockey World Cup and CSP Copa America.

United States squad - 2010 FIRS Roller Hockey B World Cup

Team Staff
 General Manager:
 Mechanic:

Coaching Staff
 Head Coach: James Trussell
 Assistant: James "Pat" Ferguson

Titles
 3 FIRS Roller Hockey B World Cup- 1996, 2008, 2010

References

External links
USA Roller Sports Federation

National Roller Hockey Team
Roller hockey
National roller hockey (quad) teams